Oluwarotimi Odunayo Akeredolu   (born 21 July 1956) is a Nigerian lawyer and politician who is currently the Governor of Ondo State, in office since 24 February 2017. 

His adopted prefix is "Arakunrin", while his nickname is "Aketi". He is a Senior Advocate of Nigeria (SAN) who became president of the Nigerian Bar Association in 2008. Akeredolu was also a Managing Partner at the law firm of Olujinmi & Akeredolu, which he co-founded with Chief Akin Olujinmi, a former Attorney General and Minister for Justice of Nigeria. On 21 July 2020, he was declared as the Ondo governorship candidate after the primary elections under the platform of the APC. He is the current Governor of Ondo State and doubles as the chairman of Southwest Governors Forum.

Birth and education
Akeredolu was born on 21 July 1956 in Owo to Reverend J. Ola Akeredolu of the Akeredolu family and Lady Evangelist Grace B. Akeredolu of Aderoyiju family of Igbotu, Ese Odo, in Ondo State. Akeredolu started his primary education at a government school in Owo. He proceeded to Aquinas College, Akure, Loyola College, Ibadan and a comprehensive high school, Ayetoro, for his secondary school education and Higher School Certificate, respectively. His middle name "Odunayo" means "Year of happiness" in Yoruba He went on to the University of Ife (now Obafemi Awolowo University) to study law, graduating in 1977. He was referred to as the Nigerian Bar 1978.

Career
Akeredolu was appointed Attorney General of Ondo State from 1997 to 1999. In 1998, he became a Senior Advocate of Nigeria. He was Chairman of the Legal Aid Council (2005–2006). In November 2009 he faced allegations of corruption when the Bar Association's third Vice-President, Welfare Secretary and Assistant Financial Secretary circulated a petition entitled "Complaints against your fraudulent manifestations, violation of the NBA". Subsequently, the allegations against him were reviewed and dropped by the National Executive council of the Nigerian Bar Association.

In a lecture in December 2009, Akeredolu said no amount of electoral reform or judicial system could give Nigeria free and fair elections if Nigerians themselves refused to take practical steps to ensure that their votes count. Later that month he stated that Umaru Yar'Adua, the President of Nigeria should have handed over to Vice-President Goodluck Jonathan in an acting capacity during his illness, a statement that was backed up by the Nigerian Bar Association who said he was authorized to speak on their behalf.

In 2012, the Nigerian Bar Association named its new secretariat in Abuja after him, with its president citing the reason being the need for "generational identification and recognition of those who had contributed immensely to the development of the association. The sheer courage for him (Akeredolu) to go through the rigour is a testimony to his selfless service."

On 4 February 2022, he was awarded as the Grand Patron of the NDLEA.by the Chairman of National Drug Law Enforcement Agency (NDLEA), Brig-Gen. Mohammed Marwa (rtd).

Governorship candidate

In November 2011, Akeredolu was among a crowd of aspirants to be Action Congress of Nigeria (ACN) candidate for Governor of Ondo State in the 2013 elections. During an interview that month, Akeredolu said that he had become well known and respected as president of the Bar, and described himself as a progressive. If elected, his priorities would include agricultural development, fish farming for export, improvements to education, jobs for youths and improved roads. He would provide free education and primary health care. He was in favour of increased subsidies and greater local control over public spending.

On 28 July 2012, On Akeredolu was selected as the Action Congress of Nigeria (ACN) candidate for Governor of Ondo State during the ACN congress in Akure. His selection pitched him in a head-to-head battle with the incumbent, Olusegun Mimiko and Mr Olusola Oke of the Peoples Democratic Party (PDP). Akeredolu promised to create 30,000 jobs in his first 100 days in office. His promise was refuted by the Peoples Democratic Party (PDP) as a ruse. His promise nonetheless resulted in the submission of over 10,000 CVs to his campaign office.

On Saturday September 3, 2016, in a controversial primary election that rocked the ruling party during which Asiwaju Bola Tinubu a major party voice and National Leader of the ruling APC demanded the resignation of the party's chairman John Odigie-Oyegun, Akeredolu was awarded ticket to represent the All Progressive Congress (APC) the 2016 elections for governor. On Sunday, 27 November 2016, he was declared winner of the keenly contested 2016 Ondo State gubernatorial election.

In 2020, Aketi Movement gathered the support of over 100 groups with 200,000 members across the three senatorial districts of Ondo State for the re-election of Aketi as the state governor.

On 29 July 2020, Rotimi Akeredolu Picked Lucky Aiyedatiwa as his running mate for the Ondo State 2020 governorship election after the controversy between the Governor and his Deputy, Agboola Ajayi.

He was declared winner of the October 2020 governorship election in Ondo State on the 11th of October 2020 after winning 15 out of 18 local governments.

Governor of Ondo State

On Sunday, 27 November 2016, Akeredolu was announced by the Independent National Electoral Commission as the winner of the Ondo State Governorship Election. He amassed 244, 842 votes in the election while Mr. Jegede with 150,380 votes and Mr. Oke with 126,889 votes. According to Professor Ganiyu Ambali, INEC Returning Officer, Akeredolu defeated two major opponents, Eyitayo Jegede of the People's Democratic Party (PDP) and Olusola Oke of the Alliance for Democracy (AD), to clinch victory. He was sworn in as the governor of Ondo State on 24 February 2017 in Akure, the Ondo State Capital.

He won the battle to re-contest for the Ondo State 2020 governorship election after beating Olusola Oke, DI Kekemeke, Jimi Odimayo, Segun Abraham and others in the APC primary election.

On Saturday 10 October 2020, Akeredolu was re-elected Governor of Ondo State and announced by the Independent National Electoral Commission on 11 October 2020. He won with a total number of 292,830 valid votes against his major opponents from the People's Democratic Party and the Zenith Labour Party, Eyitayo Jegede and Agboola Ajayi respectively.

He was sworn-in for a second term in office on Feb 24,2021. His new Deputy in person of Lucky Aiyedatiwa, assumed office on the same date and he is the incumbent Deputy Governor of Ondo State.

He has advocated for the payment of taxes in the state to help boost the economy of the state and fulfilments of obligations.

Following the June 2022 Owo church attack against Catholics in Ondo, Akeredolu condemned the attack as "satanic."

He is currently starting up a sea port project in Ondo state and he has stated that his administration was committed to the completion project, which was initiated in his first term, saying the port would not only serve Nigeria but also the whole of West Africa once built.

National honours 
In October 2022, a Nigerian national honour of Commander of the Order of the Niger (CON) was conferred on Akeredolu by President Muhammadu Buhari.

See also 
Tunde Eso

References

External links

1956 births
Living people
People from Owo
20th-century Nigerian lawyers
Senior Advocates of Nigeria
Obafemi Awolowo University alumni
Yoruba legal professionals
Loyola College, Ibadan alumni
Politicians from Ondo State
All Progressives Congress politicians
Yoruba politicians
21st-century Nigerian lawyers